Anthony "Tony" Mancini (17 January 1913 – 19 August 1990) was a Canadian boxer. He competed in the men's welterweight event at the 1932 Summer Olympics.

References

External links
 

1913 births
1990 deaths
Canadian male boxers
Olympic boxers of Canada
Boxers at the 1932 Summer Olympics
Place of birth missing
Welterweight boxers